Sapunova is a Russian surname. Notable people with the surname include:

 Tatyana Sapunova (born 1974), Russian biophysicist
 Yuliya Sapunova (born 1988), Ukrainian triathlete

See also
 Sapunov

Russian-language surnames